The year 1624 in science and technology involved some significant events.

Astronomy
 Jakob Bartsch's star atlas is the first to depict six recently discovered constellations, including Camelopardalis around the North Star.

Exploration
 July or August – Portuguese Jesuit priest António de Andrade becomes the first European to enter Tibet.

Mathematics
 Henry Briggs publishes Arithmetica Logarithmica.
 Edmund Gunter produces The description and use of sector, the cross-staffe, and other instruments for such as are studious of mathematical practise, notable for being published in English as a practical text.

Medicine

Technology
 12 September – Cornelis Drebbel demonstrates his third submarine on the River Thames in England. 
 The 15-arch Berwick Bridge in Great Britain by James Burrell is opened to traffic.

Events
 25 May – The Parliament of England passes the Statute of Monopolies, requiring patent monopolies to show novelty.
 The Parlement of France passes a decree forbidding criticism of Aristotle on pain of death.

Births
 10 September – Thomas Sydenham, English physician, the first person to recommend the use of quinine for relieving symptoms of malaria (died 1689)

Deaths
 Giuseppe Biancani, Italian astronomer (born 1566)
 5 December – Gaspard Bauhin, Swiss botanist and physician who developed an important early plant classification system (born 1560)
 26 December – Simon Marius, German astronomer (born 1573)

References

 
17th century in science
1620s in science